is a railway station in Usuki, Ōita, Japan. It is operated by JR Kyushu and is on the Nippō Main Line.

Lines

Layout 
The station, which is not staffed, consists of an island platform serving two tracks on a side hill cutting. There is no station building but a simple hexagonal shed has been set up as a waiting room. A shelter housing an automatic ticket vending machine is also provided at the station entrance. Access to island platform is by means of a footbridge. A bike shed is provided near the station entrance.

Adjacent stations

History
Japanese Government Railways (JGR) opened the station on 1 October 1947 as an additional station on the existing track of its Nippō Main Line. With the privatization of Japanese National Railways (JNR), the successor of JGR, on 1 April 1987, the station came under the control of JR Kyushu.

Passenger statistics
In fiscal 2015, there were a total of 24,101 boarding passengers, giving a daily average of 66 passengers.

See also
List of railway stations in Japan

References

External links 

Sashiu (JR Kyushu)

Railway stations in Ōita Prefecture
Railway stations in Japan opened in 1947